Francis Michael Powell (born 17 June 1977) is an English former professional footballer who played as a winger in the Football League.

References

External links

1977 births
Living people
English footballers
Footballers from Burnley
Association football midfielders
Burnley F.C. players
Rochdale A.F.C. players
Southport F.C. players
English Football League players